Che Arthur is an American singer, songwriter, multi-instrumentalist, and an engineer/tour manager. He is based in Chicago, Illinois.

Background
Born in Mobile, Alabama, Arthur played guitar, keyboards, bass, and drums in numerous Southern U.S. touring rock bands. In the mid 1990s he moved to Chicago, where he played guitar in the band Universal Life and Accident, in which he was the singer and principal songwriter, and later in Atombombpocketknife.

Musical career
Universal Life and Accident
Atombombpocketknife (1997–2005)
Pink Avalanche (since 2012)

Discography

Atombombpocketknife
God Save the ABPK (2001)
Lack and Pattern (2004)

Solo albums
All Of Your Tomorrows Were Decided Today (2004)  
Iron (2007)   
Like Revenge (2009)

References

External links
 Che Arthur Website

Year of birth missing (living people)
Living people
Musicians from Alabama
Musicians from Chicago
American LGBT musicians
Flameshovel Records artists
21st-century American LGBT people